Heterocampa biundata, the wavy-lined heterocampa, is a species of moth in the family Notodontidae (the prominents). It was first described by Francis Walker in 1855 and it is found in North America.

The MONA or Hodges number for Heterocampa biundata is 7995.

References

Further reading

External links

 

Notodontidae
Articles created by Qbugbot
Moths described in 1855